The 2009–10 Old Dominion Monarchs men's basketball team represented Old Dominion University in the 2009–10 college basketball season. This was head coach Blaine Taylor's ninth season at Old Dominion. The Monarchs compete in the Colonial Athletic Association and played their home games at the Ted Constant Convocation Center. They finished the season 27–9, 15–3 in CAA play to win the regulars season championship. They also won the 2010 CAA men's basketball tournament to earn the CAA's automatic bid to the 2010 NCAA Division I men's basketball tournament. They earned an 11 seed in the South Region where they upset 6 seed Notre Dame in the first round before losing to 3 seed and AP #19 Baylor in the second round.

Preseason
In the CAA preseason polls, released October 20 in Washington, D.C., Old Dominion was predicted to finish first in the CAA. Sr. C/F Gerald Lee was selected to the preseason all conference first team and was picked as the conference preseason co–player of the year with Hofstra's Charles Jenkins. Jr. G/F Ben Finney was a preseason conference honorable mention.

Roster

Coaching staff
Blaine Taylor – Head Coach
Jim Corrigan – Assistant Coach
John Richardson – Assistant Coach
Robert Wilkes – Assistant Coach
Joel Hines – Director of Basketball Operations

Schedule and results
Source
All times are Eastern

|-
!colspan=9| Exhibition

|-
!colspan=9| Regular Season

|-
!colspan=10| 2010 CAA men's basketball tournament

|-
!colspan=10| 2010 NCAA Division I men's basketball tournament

References

Old Dominion
Old Dominion Monarchs men's basketball seasons
Old Dominion
Old Dominion
Old Dominion